Terebellides is a genus of polychaete worms in the family Trichobranchidae.

Terebellides sepultura is named after the Brazilian heavy metal band Sepultura.

Species

References

Terebellida
Polychaete genera
Taxa named by Michael Sars